Princess Ariana Austin Makonnen of Ethiopia (née Ariana Joy Lalita Austin) is an American writer, arts manager and philanthropist. She is the founder of the evening arts festival Art All Night and of the creative agency French Thomas. In 2018, she and her husband launched Old World/New World Productions, a media company that produces content focusing on the African diaspora.

Makonnen, who is the granddaughter of Lord Mayor John Meredith Ford of Georgetown, Guyana, serves as the Goodwill Ambassador of Friends of Guyana. In 2019, she spoke at the Third Annual Women's Leadership and Business Conference at the Arthur Chung Conference Centre. She is a member of the Ethiopian imperial family through her marriage to Prince Joel Dawit Makonnen, the great-grandson of Emperor Haile Selassie I.

Family 
Makonnen was born in Washington, D.C., to Bobby William Austin, president of the Neighborhood Associates Corporation and the first African-American full-time faculty member at Georgetown University, and Joy Ford, the former executive director of Humanities DC, an affiliate of the National Endowment for the Humanities. She is of African-American and Indo-Guyanese descent. Her maternal grandfather, John Meredith Ford, was Lord Mayor of Georgetown, Guyana. Her maternal great-grandfather, Thomas Janki, was the first ordained Presbyterian elder for Demerara in British Guiana.

Education and career 
Makonnen graduated magna cum laude with a bachelor's degree in English literature from Fisk University. While at Fisk, she was inducted into Phi Beta Kappa. As an undergraduate she studied abroad at Magdalen College, Oxford and through Semester at Sea. She has a master's degree in arts education and creative writing from Harvard University. After finishing school she moved to Paris and worked as a teacher and freelance journalist. Inspired by the French art festival Nuit Blanche, she founded and directed Art All Night, an evening arts festival in Washington, D.C. featuring visual arts, live paintings, musical performances, light projections, and poetry readings. Five years after starting Art All Night, Makonnen founded French Thomas, a creative agency that produced cultural and educational experiences in New York City, Camden and Washington, D.C. She works in philanthropy at a division of Rockefeller Philanthropy Advisors and serves as the Goodwill Ambassador of Friends of Guyana. She has worked as a contributing writer for HuffPost.

In November 2018 Makonnen and her husband launched Old World/New World Productions, a media company that produces documentaries, feature films, and television shows focused on Africa and the African diaspora.

In May 2019 Makonnen was a co-host at a salon dinner for women leaders hosted by German diplomat Emily Haber.

In September 2019 Makonnen was a speaker at the third annual Women's Leadership and Business Conference, PowHERful: Transition from Inspiration to Action at the Arthur Chung Conference Centre in Guyana. She delivered a speech on cultural entrepreneurship.

Personal life 
She met Prince Joel Dawit Makonnen, a great-grandson of the last Emperor of Ethiopia, at Pearl nightclub in Washington, D.C. in December 2005. She and Prince Joel Dawit Makonnen got engaged in 2014. The couple were married on 9 September 2017 in an Ethiopian Orthodox ceremony at Debre Genet Medhanealem Ethiopian Orthodox Tewahido Church in Temple Hills, Maryland. Makonnen converted to Ethiopian Orthodoxy shortly before the wedding. The wedding, which was officiated by thirteen priests, was featured in The New York Times and went viral, receiving international attention. The couple were both crowned during the ceremony per Orthodox matrimony tradition. The reception was held at Foxchase Manor in Manassas, Virginia. There were over three hundred guests at the wedding, including Prince Ermias Sahle Selassie, Prince Paul Makonnen, Prince Phillip Makonnen, Prince Beedemariam Makonnen, Princess Mary Asfaw Wossen, Johnnetta Cole, Sharon Pratt, and Brandon Todd. The wedding festivities lasted five days, from 5 September until 10 September.

Prior to the wedding of Prince Harry and Meghan Markle, media outlets listed Makonnen along with Princess Angela of Liechtenstein, Princess Keisha Omilana of Ipetu-Ijesha, Princess Sikhanyiso Dlamini of Swaziland, Emma Thynn, Viscountess Weymouth, Cécile de Massy, Princess Sarah Culberson, and Monica von Neumann as modern examples of black royal and noble women. A resurgence of articles about African royalty and nobles of African heritage, including Makonnen, circulated after the British royal wedding.

References 

Living people
African-American women writers
Ambassadors of supra-national bodies
American people of Guyanese descent
American women philanthropists
American Oriental Orthodox Christians
Converts to Tewahedo Orthodoxy
Ethiopian Orthodox Christians
Ethiopian princesses
Fisk University alumni
Harvard University alumni
Solomonic dynasty
Princesses by marriage
Year of birth missing (living people)